Starrcade was a recurring professional wrestling event, originally broadcast via closed-circuit television and eventually broadcast via pay-per-view. It was originally held from 1983 to 2000, first by the National Wrestling Alliance (NWA) from 1983 to 1990, with the 1983–1987 events specifically held by Jim Crockett Promotions (JCP) under the NWA, and then held by World Championship Wrestling (WCW) from 1988 to 2000. 

Starrcade was regarded by the NWA and WCW as their flagship event of the year, much in the same vein that its rival, the World Wrestling Federation (WWF), regarded WrestleMania. As a result, the buildup to each Starrcade featured the largest feuds of the promotion. In 2001, the WWF acquired WCW, and the WWF was renamed to World Wrestling Entertainment (WWE) in 2002. 

WWE revived the event in 2017 as a house show with portions of the events in 2018 and 2019 airing as WWE Network specials. Due to the COVID-19 pandemic, an event was not held in 2020 and no further events have been scheduled.

History
From 1983 to 1987, Starrcade was produced by the National Wrestling Alliance's (NWA) Jim Crockett Promotions (JCP), the dominant promotion of the NWA, and aired on Thanksgiving Day. In 1987, the World Wrestling Federation (WWF) scheduled a pay-per-view (PPV) of their own, Survivor Series, on Thanksgiving night and demanded exclusivity from cable providers on carriage of the event. In order to prevent such a problem, Starrcade was moved to December the following year and the show was held around Christmas Day, mostly in the days following, beginning in 1988. Also in 1988, JCP was sold to Turner Broadcasting due to financial problems and became World Championship Wrestling (WCW), though Starrcade was held under the NWA banner until 1990.

From the 1960s to the 1980s, it was tradition for JCP to hold major professional wrestling events on Thanksgiving and Christmas, mostly at Greensboro Coliseum. In 1983, JCP created Starrcade as their supercard to continue the Thanksgiving tradition, and spread it across its territory on closed-circuit television. It popularized broadcasting on closed-circuit television and was financially successful. From 1987, Starrcade was broadcast on PPV, the first NWA event to do so.

Starrcade was held for the final time as a WCW event in 2000: the promotion would be acquired by the WWF in 2001, and the brand would become dormant. In 2002, the WWF was renamed to World Wrestling Entertainment (with its "WWE" abbreviation becoming an orphaned initialism in 2011). In 2017, WWE revived Starrcade for a SmackDown-branded non-televised house show on November 25, 2017. The following year, WWE's Starrcade house shows began to be held as WWE Network specials and featured both the Raw and SmackDown brands. An event did not occur in 2020 due to the COVID-19 pandemic, which prevented WWE from holding shows outside of its normal weekly television programming and PPVs. WWE resumed live touring in July 2021, but a Starrcade event was not scheduled for that year.

Events

2017

The 2017 Starrcade was the 19th Starrcade professional wrestling event. It was the first Starrcade promoted by WWE and was held exclusively for wrestlers from the promotion's SmackDown brand division as a non-televised house show. It took place on November 25, 2017, at the Greensboro Coliseum Complex in Greensboro, North Carolina. It was the first Starrcade event in seventeen years. It was also the first Starrcade event not to be televised in any way and the first to be held in the Greensboro Coliseum since 1985. The event featured appearances by Ric Flair, Arn Anderson, Ricky Steamboat, The Rock 'n' Roll Express, and The Hardy Boyz.

References

 
Recurring events established in 1983
Recurring events disestablished in 2000